Soham is a small town in the English county of Cambridgeshire.

Soham may also refer to:

 Soham (given name)
 Soham (actor), Bengali film actor
 Soham (Sanskrit), a Hindu mantra
 Soham railway station, a station serving Soham, Cambridgeshire
 Soham, New Mexico, United States, an unincorporated community
 Soham TV, a Hindi-language 24/7 television channel

See also
 Earl Soham, Suffolk, England
 Monk Soham, Suffolk, England